is a Japanese football player. He plays for Matsumoto Yamaga FC.

Career
Yota Shimokawa joined J2 League club Matsumoto Yamaga FC in 2017, before signing on loan firstly for Ehime FC and then Zweigen Kanazawa.

Club statistics
Updated to 5 April 2020.

References

External links
Profile at Matsumoto Yamaga

1995 births
Living people
Osaka University of Commerce alumni
Association football people from Osaka Prefecture
Japanese footballers
J2 League players
Matsumoto Yamaga FC players
Ehime FC players
Zweigen Kanazawa players
Association football fullbacks